Yngve Wahlander (born 15 September 1958) is a Swedish athlete. He competed in the men's shot put at the 1984 Summer Olympics.

References

1958 births
Living people
Athletes (track and field) at the 1984 Summer Olympics
Swedish male shot putters
Olympic athletes of Sweden
Place of birth missing (living people)